Carenum submetallicum is a species of ground beetle in the subfamily Scaritinae, found in Australia. It was described by William John Macleay in 1871.

References

submetallicum
Beetles described in 1871